Pieter Leermans (c. 1635, Leiden – 1706), was a Dutch Golden Age painter.

Biography

According to the Netherlands Institute for Art History he was a portrait painter of historical allegories. He is also known as Lieremans.

Little is known of his life, but he is considered to be one of the Leiden fijnschilders, as his "Hermit" in Dresden shows Gerard Dou's influence.

References

Painting of an unknown lady as Maria Magdalena by Pieter Leermans

1630s births
1706 deaths
Dutch Golden Age painters
Dutch male painters
Artists from Leiden